Hiidenheimo is a surname. Notable people with the surname include:

Artturi Hiidenheimo (1877–1956), Finnish politician
Pentti Hiidenheimo (1875–1918), Finnish politician

Finnish-language surnames